Daniela Álvarez may refer to:

Daniela Álvarez (model) (born 1993), Mexican beauty pageant titleholder
Daniela Álvarez (tennis) (born 1983), Bolivian professional tennis player

See also
Daniella Álvarez, Colombian model